Beyond the Veil may refer to:

 Beyond the Veil (album), a 1999 album by Tristania
 Beyond the Veil: Live at the Bobby Jones Gospel Explosion XIII, a 1996 album by Daryl Coley
 "Beyond the Veil" (song), a 2014 song by Lindsey Stirling
 "Beyond the Veil" (The Outer Limits), a television episode
 Beyond the Veil (comics), a comic by Rick Law
 Beyond the Veil, a 1985 book by Fatima Mernissi
 Beyond the Veil, a 2013 play by Deborah McAndrew